is a 1969 Japanese drama film directed by Kaneto Shindo and starring Nobuko Otowa.

Plot
Otoyo is a former Seto Inland Sea island farmer who has moved to the mainland in order to find work, but instead ends up dead. The film begins with the discovery of her corpse, which leads to an investigation that uncovers the narcotics, prostitution, and murder in which many poor farmers had found themselves trapped after World War II.

Cast
Nobuko Otowa - Otoyo
Juzo Itami - Iino

References

External links

1969 films
Films directed by Kaneto Shindo
1960 films
Japanese drama films
1960s Japanese films